The  superyacht Plvs Vltra was launched by Amels Holland B.V. at their yard in Vlissingen. She was sold by Moran Yacht & Ship. She was designed by Tim Heywood, and the interior design was created by Winch Design. She has two sister ships, the 2017 built New Secret and the 2018 built Universe.

Design 
The hull is built out of steel while the superstructure is made out of aluminium with teak laid decks. The yacht is classed by Lloyd's Register and flagged in the Cayman Islands.

See also
 List of motor yachts by length
 List of yachts built by Amels BV

References

2016 ships
Motor yachts
Ships built in Vlissingen